Gerhard Braunitzer (24 September 1921 – 27 May 1989) was a German biochemist who was a pioneer in protein sequencing.  He refined a method of C-terminal analysis that was used in early sequencing work, and he generated the first full sequence of a hemoglobin chain (β-hemoglobin).  He worked at the Max Planck Institute of Biochemistry.  Later in his career he was a significant researcher in the field of molecular evolution.

References
"Gerhard Braunitzer September 24, 1921–May 27, 1989", Journal of Molecular Evolution, Volume 29, Number 6, December, 1989

German biochemists
1921 births
1989 deaths
Max Planck Institute directors